Taupota is an Oceanic language of the Milne Bay Province, Papua New Guinea. It appears to be a dialect chain, with southern varieties called Wa'ema and western Wedau.

References

Nuclear Papuan Tip languages
Languages of Milne Bay Province